Kumbakkarai Falls are lesser known falls in the foothills of the Kodaikanal Hills. Kumbakkarai Falls are located along the Kodai-Vellagavi-Periyakulam footpath.

These falls have two stages. At the first stage, water collects in huge rock recesses which are each named after wild animals such as tiger, elephant, snake etc. The Pambar river then flows  to the second stage before falling as the main waterfall.

The water originates in Kodaikanal Hills and flows along the rocks and finally reaches the foot hills. This place is called Kumbakarai. The travellers come here and take bath in the falls. The water flows throughout the year; but in rainy seasons the flow will be very heavy. Bathing is possible. There is a bus from Periyakulam with fare of Rs. 5 (6AM,7AM,1PM,3.30PM,4.30PM).  There is no guest house.

See also
The present day Kumbakarai which is tourist spot  was once nothing but a forest with water falls . Thiru K.Chellam Iyer an affluent business man of Periyakulam those days and Properiter of Bavani Krishna Vilas hotel wanted  kumbakarai water falls to be one another tourist spot similar to courtallam. He obtained permission of the British government in 1942 and  constructed dressing rooms, staircases and bathing spots in that area at his own expense  and  Kumbakarai  water falls soon turned out to be a tourist spot. The present day  Kumbakarai still speak of his name. The stone inscription at Kumbakarai waterfalls speaks about his contribution to the falls. The Murugan statue that can be seen in the Photo was Sponsored by Thiru K Chellam Iyer of Periyakulam.

References
Get All other details about Kumbakarai Falls here.

Theni district
Waterfalls of Tamil Nadu